Ray Edward Cochran (October 3, 1938 – April 17, 1960) was an American rock and roll musician. Cochran's songs, such as "Twenty Flight Rock", "Summertime Blues", "C'mon Everybody" and "Somethin' Else", captured teenage frustration and desire in the mid-1950s and early 1960s. He experimented with multitrack recording, distortion techniques, and overdubbing even on his earliest singles. He played the guitar, piano, bass, and drums. His image as a sharply dressed and attractive young man with a rebellious attitude epitomized the stance of the 1950s rocker, and in death he achieved iconic status.

Cochran was involved with music from an early age, playing in the school band and teaching himself to play blues guitar. In 1954, he formed a duet with the guitarist Hank Cochran (no relation). When they split the following year, Eddie began a songwriting career with Jerry Capehart. His first success came when he performed the song "Twenty Flight Rock" in the film The Girl Can't Help It, starring Jayne Mansfield. Soon afterward, he signed a recording contract with Liberty Records and his first record for the label, "Sittin' in the Balcony", rose to number 18 on the Billboard charts.

Cochran died at the age of 21 in St Martin's Hospital, Bath, Somerset, after a road accident in Chippenham, Wiltshire, at the end of his British tour in April 1960. He had just performed at the Bristol Hippodrome. Though his best-known songs were released during his lifetime, more of his songs were released posthumously. In 1987, Cochran was inducted into the Rock and Roll Hall of Fame. His songs have been recorded by a wide variety of recording artists.

Early life
Cochran was born on October 3, 1938, in Albert Lea, Minnesota, to Alice and Frank R. Cochran. He was of Scottish descent. His parents were from Oklahoma, and he always said in interviews that his parents had some roots in Oklahoma. He took music lessons in school but quit the band to play drums. Also, rather than taking piano lessons, he began learning guitar, playing country and other music he heard on the radio.

Career
Cochran's family moved to Bell Gardens, California, in 1952. As his guitar playing improved, he formed a band with two friends from his junior high school. He dropped out of Bell Gardens High School in his first year to become a professional musician. During a show featuring many performers at an American Legion hall, he met Hank Cochran, a songwriter. Although they were not related, they recorded as the Cochran Brothers and began performing together. They recorded a few singles for Ekko Records that were fairly successful and helped to establish them as a performing act. Eddie Cochran also worked as a session musician and began writing songs, making a demo with Jerry Capehart, his future manager.

In July 1956, Eddie Cochran's first "solo artist" single was released by Crest Records. It featured "Skinny Jim", now regarded as a rock-and-roll and rockabilly classic. In the spring of 1956, Boris Petroff asked Cochran if he would appear in the musical comedy film The Girl Can't Help It. Cochran agreed and performed the song "Twenty Flight Rock" in the movie. In 1957 Cochran starred in his second film, Untamed Youth, and he had yet another hit, "Sittin' in the Balcony", one of the few songs he recorded that was written by other songwriters (in this case John D. Loudermilk). "Twenty Flight Rock" was written by AMI staff writer Ned Fairchild (a pen name—her real name is Nelda Fairchild). Fairchild, who was not a rock and roll performer, merely provided the initial form of the song; the co-writing credit reflects Cochran's major changes and contributions to the final product.

In the Summer of 1957 Liberty Records issued Cochran's only studio album released during his lifetime, Singin' to My Baby. The album included "Sittin' in the Balcony". There were only a few rockers on this album, and Liberty seemed to want to move Cochran away from Rock and Roll.

In 1958, Cochran seemed to find his stride in the famous teenage anthem "Summertime Blues" (co-written with Jerry Capehart). With this song, Cochran was established as one of the most important influences on rock and roll in the 1950s, both lyrically and musically. The song, released by Liberty recording no. 55144, charted at number 8 in 1958. Cochran's brief career included a few more hits, such as "C'mon, Everybody", "Somethin' Else", "Teenage Heaven", "Three Steps to Heaven", which posthumously topped the charts in the Republic of Ireland and the United Kingdom in 1960. He remained popular in the United States and the United Kingdom through the late 1950s and early 1960s, and more of his records were posthumous hits, such as "My Way", "Weekend", and "Nervous Breakdown".

Another aspect of Cochran's short but brilliant career is his work as backup musician and producer. In 1959 he played lead for Skeets McDonald at Columbia's studios for "You Oughta See Grandma Rock" and "Heart Breaking Mama". In a session for Gene Vincent in March 1958, he contributed his trademark bass voice, as heard on "Summertime Blues". The recordings were issued on the album A Gene Vincent Record Date.

In early 1959, two of Cochran's friends, Buddy Holly and Ritchie Valens, along with the Big Bopper, were killed in a plane crash while on tour. Cochran's friends and family later said that he was badly shaken by their deaths, and he developed a morbid premonition that he also would die young. Shortly after their deaths, he recorded a song (written by disc jockey Tommy Dee) in tribute to them, "Three Stars". He was anxious to give up life on the road and spend his time in the studio making music, thereby reducing the chance of suffering a similar fatal accident while touring. Financial responsibilities, however, required that he continue to perform live, and that led to his acceptance of an offer to tour the United Kingdom in 1960.

Death

Cochran was on tour in the United Kingdom from January through April 1960. He and his friend and fellow performing artist Gene Vincent had just finished performing at the last of their scheduled concerts at the Bristol Hippodrome on April 16, a Saturday night. They were traveling along the Bath Road in a taxi (a cream-coloured 1960 model Ford Consul Mark II saloon) from Bristol towards London. In addition to Cochran and Vincent, the other passengers in the vehicle were Sharon Sheeley (a 20-year-old songwriter and Cochran's fiancée), Patrick Tompkins (the tour manager, 29 years old), and George Martin (the 19-year-old taxi driver). At about 11:50 p.m. that night, Martin lost control of the vehicle, which crashed into a concrete lamppost at Rowden Hill in Chippenham. At the moment of impact, Cochran (who was seated in the center of the back seat) threw himself over Sheeley to shield her. The force of the collision caused the left rear passenger door to open, and Cochran was ejected from the vehicle, sustaining a massive traumatic brain injury from blunt force trauma to the skull. The road was dry and the weather was good, but the vehicle was later determined to be travelling at an excessive speed. No other vehicle was involved in the incident.

The occupants of the vehicle were all taken to Chippenham Community Hospital and later transferred to St Martin's Hospital in Bath. Cochran never regained consciousness, and died at 4:10 p.m. the following day – Easter Sunday. Sheeley suffered injuries to her back and thigh, Vincent suffered a fractured collarbone and severe injuries to his legs, and Tompkins sustained facial injuries and a possible fracture of the base of the skull. Martin did not sustain significant injuries.

Vincent and Sheeley returned to the United States after the accident. Cochran's body was flown home, and after a funeral service was buried on April 25, at Forest Lawn Memorial Park in Cypress, California. Martin was convicted of dangerous driving, fined £50 (and in default of payment six months imprisonment), and disqualified from driving for 15 years. His driving disqualification was lifted on May 7, 1968, after the judge at Bristol Assizes determined that Martin "had suffered considerable financial hardship". The car and other items from the crash were impounded at the local police station until a coroner's inquest could be held. David Harman, a police cadet at the station, who would later become known as Dave Dee of the band Dave Dee, Dozy, Beaky, Mick & Tich, is said to have played on Cochran's Gretsch 6120 guitar while it was held at the station.

There is a plaque marking the site of the car crash on Rowden Hill. There is also a memorial stone on the grounds of St Martin's Hospital in Bath, commemorating Cochran's death. The stone was restored in 2010 on the 50th anniversary of his death and can be found in the old chapel grounds at the hospital. A memorial plaque was also placed next to the sundial at the back of the old chapel. The Eddie Cochran Memorial Project spearheaded a fundraising campaign in 2018 to restore the plaque and install a brand new "Three Steps to Heaven" base at the Chippenham crash site.

Posthumous releases and honors
A posthumous album, My Way, was released in 1964. Cochran was a prolific performer, and the British label Rockstar Records has released more of his music posthumously than was released during his life. The company is still looking for unpublished songs. One of his posthumous releases was "Three Stars", a tribute to J.P. Richardson, better known as the Big Bopper, and Cochran's friends Buddy Holly and Ritchie Valens, who had all died in a plane crash just one year earlier. Written just hours after the tragedy by disc jockey Tommy Dee, it was recorded by Cochran two days later (Dee recorded his own version several weeks later). His voice broke during the spoken lyrics about Valens and Holly.

In 1987, Cochran was inducted into the Rock and Roll Hall of Fame. His pioneering contribution to the genre of rockabilly has also been recognized by the Rockabilly Hall of Fame. Several of his songs have been re-released since his death, such as "C'mon Everybody", which was a number 14 hit in 1988 in the UK. Rolling Stone magazine ranked him number 84 on its 2003 list of the 100 greatest guitarists of all time. Cochran's life is chronicled in several publications, including Don't Forget Me: The Eddie Cochran Story, by Julie Mundy and Darrel Higham, and Three Steps to Heaven, by Bobby Cochran. The Very Best of Eddie Cochran was released by EMI Records on June 2, 2008. On September 27, 2010, the mayor of Bell Gardens, California, declared October 3, 2010, to be "Eddie Cochran Day" to celebrate the famous musician who began his career when living in that city.

In 1963, pop star Heinz Burt and producer Joe Meek paid tribute to Cochran with the song "Just Like Eddie" which became a top five chart hit.

In 2022, Cochran's home town named a street in his honor.

Style and influence
Cochran was one of the first rock-and-roll artists to write his own songs and overdub tracks. He is also credited with being one of the first to use an unwound third string to "bend" notes up a whole tone—an innovation (imparted to UK guitarist Joe Brown, who secured much session work as a result) that has since become an essential part of the standard rock guitar vocabulary. Artists such as Joan Jett and the Blackhearts, the Rolling Stones, Bruce Springsteen, UFO (band), Van Halen, Tom Petty, Rod Stewart, T. Rex, Cliff Richard, the Who, Stray Cats, the Beach Boys, the Beatles, Blue Cheer, Led Zeppelin, the White Stripes, the Sex Pistols, Sid Vicious, Rush, Simple Minds, George Thorogood, Guitar Wolf, Paul McCartney, Alan Jackson, Terry Manning, the Move, David Bowie, Jimi Hendrix, Johnny Hallyday and U2 have covered his songs.

It was because Paul McCartney knew the chords and words to "Twenty Flight Rock" that he became a member of the Beatles. John Lennon was so impressed that he invited McCartney to play with his band, the Quarrymen. Jimi Hendrix performed "Summertime Blues" early in his career, and Pete Townshend of the Who was heavily influenced by Cochran's guitar style ("Summertime Blues" was a staple of live performances by the Who for most of their career, until the death of bassist and vocalist John Entwistle in 2002, and is featured on their album Live at Leeds). San Francisco Sound band Blue Cheer's version of "Summertime Blues" was their only hit and signature song, and has been described as the first heavy metal song. Terry Manning recorded a live version of "Somethin' Else" at a concert inside Elvis Presley's first house in Memphis.

The glam rock artist Marc Bolan had his main Gibson Les Paul guitar refinished in a transparent orange to resemble the Gretsch 6120 played by Cochran, who was his music hero. He was also an influence on the guitar player Brian Setzer, of Stray Cats, who plays a 6120 almost like that of Cochran, whom he portrayed in the film La Bamba.

Filmography

Discography

References

Bibliography
 
 Mundy, Julie; Higham, Darrel (2000). Don't Forget Me: The Eddie Cochran Story. Edinburgh: Mainstream Publishing. .
 Sheeley, Sharon (2010). Summertime Blues. Ravenhawk Books. .

External links

 
 
 

1938 births
1960 deaths
20th-century American guitarists
20th-century American male musicians
20th-century American singers
Accidental deaths in England
American country rock singers
American country singer-songwriters
American male guitarists
American male singer-songwriters
American rock guitarists
American rock singers
American rockabilly guitarists
Burials in Orange County, California
Cash Records artists
Crest Records artists
Ekko Records artists
Guitarists from Minnesota
Liberty Records artists
People from Albert Lea, Minnesota
People from Bell Gardens, California
Road incident deaths in England
Rock and roll musicians
Singer-songwriters from California
Singer-songwriters from Minnesota